Bangor is a suburb in southern Sydney, in the state of New South Wales, Australia. Bangor is located 28 kilometres south of the Sydney central business district, in the local government area of the Sutherland Shire in the area commonly called Menai. Bangor sits south of the Georges River and to the west of the Woronora River.

History
The name 'Bangor' was selected in 1895 by the land's owner, a farmer named Owen Jones, after his birthplace Bangor in Wales. To avoid confusion with Bangor in Tasmania, the Postmaster General's Office changed the suburb name to Menai in 1910. Another Australian Bangor is located in South Australia. Menai Bridge is a town opposite the original Bangor, on the Menai Strait in Wales. When Menai expanded, the eastern section was renamed Bangor in 1976.

As part of the modern development of Bangor, the streets were all named with an Aboriginal theme

Population
In the 2016 Census, there were 5,568 people in Bangor.  81.1% of people were born in Australia. The next most common country of birth was England at 3.8%.  87.4% of people spoke only English at home. Other languages spoken at home included Greek at 1.8%. The most common responses for religion were Catholic 29.7%, Anglican 25.4% and No Religion 18.8%.

Commercial area
Bangor is a mostly residential suburb with a small shopping centre which consists of Bangor Community Pharmacy, Bangor Newsagency, Bangor Post Office, Bangor Bakery, Manson Property, Friendly Grocer supermarket, Peter's Bangor Chinese, Thai Max, ABC School Wear, Bangor Dry Cleaners, Bangor Butchers and Little FinsSwim School. In late 2018, the shopping centre commenced renovations. Bangor Tavern is in a neighbouring building. A commercial car wash and fitness gym also operate in the immediate area of the shopping centre.

Schools
 Bangor Public School: K-6
 Inaburra School: K-12

Churches
Menai Salvation Army 
Menai Baptist Church (meeting in Inaburra School)

Transport
The main road running through Bangor and Menai is Menai Road. The Bangor Bypass was completed in February 2005 to alleviate traffic in the area.

Transdev NSW buses (routes 961 and 962) connect Bangor to Menai, Illawong, Alfords Point, Barden Ridge, Padstow, Bankstown, Sutherland, Kirrawee, Gymea and Miranda. Metrobus M92 runs between Sutherland and Parramatta via Bankstown. It also runs a weekend bus service to Cronulla.

The closest train station is Sutherland, on the T4 Illawarra line; although Padstow on the T8 East Hills/Airport line is also frequently used. Transdev buses service Bangor from both these train stations.

A family friendly cycle way runs from Sutherland to Padstow through Bangor, which links up with the broader Sydney cycle way.

Sport and recreation
Bangor has tennis courts at Pyree St and Yala Rd.  Yala Rd sporting facilities also include netball courts. Bangor also has two sporting ovals (Akuna Oval and Billa Oval) named after the roads they are situated on. Bangor is home to the Bangor Brumbies soccer club and its home field is Billa Oval. The Menai Roosters football team uses Akuna Oval as its home oval, as well as the Bangor-Barden Ridge Cricket Club. The Bangor Scout Group was established in 1986 with a Scout Hall in Ross Reserve in Pyree Street and caters for youth aged from 6 to 26 years old.

The nearby rivers and extensive bush areas are popular with the locals and offer a variety of outdoor activities including bush walking, mountain bike riding, canoeing, kayaking, rowing, fishing.

A small commercial swimming pool operates from the Bangor Shopping Centre. A larger council run swimming complex operates at Sutherland.

Children's playgrounds exist at:
Akuna Reserve, 
Billa Oval, 
Jelba Reserve and
Ross Reserve.

References

Suburbs of Sydney
Sutherland Shire